Amāvásyā is the lunar phase of the new moon in Sanskrit. 
Indian calendars use 30 lunar phases, called tithi in India. The dark moon tithi is when the Moon is within 12 degrees of the angular distance between the Sun and Moon before conjunction (syzygy). The New Moon tithi (called Pratipada or Prathama) is the 12 angular degrees after syzygy. Amāvásyā is often translated as new moon since there is no standard term for the Moon before conjunction in English.

Meaning of Amāvásyā

In Sanskrit, "amā" means "together" and "vásya" means "to dwell" or "cohabit". It also means "na" +"ma"+"asya" meaning to "na" = "No, "ma"=Moon, "Asya"="There" in turn meaning to There is no Moon i.e., Moon is not visible.

In the pūrṇimānta māna Hindu lunar calendar used in most parts of the Indian subcontinent, the lunar month starts on the day following the full moon or purnima and therefore Amāvásyā always falls in the middle of the month. However, in the amānta māna calendar used in some places, the lunar month starts on the day of the new moon, making Amāvásyā the last day of the lunar month in those places. Many festivals, the most famous being Diwali (the festival of lights), are observed on Amāvásyā. Many Hindus fast on Amāvásyā.

Few Pancha-Gauda Brahmins have month from next day of Purnima (day) to Purnima (day), that is Purnima is last 29/30 days (Purnimanta). Pancha-Dravida have month from next day of Amavasya to Amavasya . Amavasya is last 29/30 days (Amanta). Śhukla paksha is called as the bright half as the Moon changes from New Moon to Full Moon while in Krishna paksha it changes from Full Moon to New Moon. Hence it is seen that same Amavasya has same festival all over the country. Ujjain, Allahabad, Orissa, Bihar Brahmins are one few Pancha-Gauda Brahmins have month from 1 day after Purnima (day) to Purnima (day)(Purnimanta), While the people of Karnataka, Maharashtra, Goa, Gujarat, Kerala and Andhra Pradesh the Pancha-Dravida have month from 1 day after Amavasya to Amavasya. Amavasya is last 29/30 days (Amanta). Since Kanchipuram Mutt where the Adi Shankara lived and all the Pancha-Gauda and Pancha-Dravida use to visit hence Tamil Nadu developed a  mixture of Panchangam and saka calendar. Similarly the place where Pancha-Gauda and Pancha-Dravida are living together as Rajasthan, Madhya Pradesh, Southern Uttar Pradesh and Chhattisgarh also show the mixtures. Also the people following Jainism follow Pancha-Dravida calendar, Amavasya is last 29/30 days.

In old Indian culture and beliefs, irrespective of religions, Amavasya  is considered a time of great power. In Tamil, though Amavasai is commonly used in religious spheres, the pure Tamil scholars prefer the term Puthuppi Rai Fast is observed to propitiate both the Sun and Moon Gods.

Festive Amavasya 
 Lakshmi Puja (30 Ashvin or 15 Krishna Paksha Kartik; the Diwali after Naraka Chaturdashi): Lakshmi Puja marks the most important day of Diwali celebrations in North India. Hindu homes worship Lakshmi, the goddess of wealth, and Ganesh, the God of auspicious beginnings also known as the remover of obstacles, and then light deeyas (little clay pots) in the streets and homes to welcome prosperity and well-being.

Tradition and Belief

Amavasya Somavati

An Amavasya falling on Mondays has a special significance. It is believed that a fast on this particular Amavasya would ward off widow-hood in women and ensure bearing of progeny. It is also believed that all desires could be fulfilled if one fasts on this Amavasya.

Worship of Forefathers (Pitra)
Every month, the Amāvāsyā day is considered auspicious for the worship of forefathers and poojas are made.  Religious people are not supposed to travel or work, and instead concentrate on the rites of Amavasyas, typically at home in the afternoon. Even today, traditional workers like masons do not work on Amavasya in India. However, they will work on Saturdays and Sundays. Even High Court judges of 18th century India used to observe Amavasya as a day off. It was the British Rule that brought the Christian Sunday-off principle to Indian industry.

On Amavasyas, Shraadh is done to forefathers by Brahmins whose fathers have died. In modern times, a short 20-minute version of the ceremony is done—offering black sesame and water as oblation to departed souls.  This oblation is offered to father, grandfather, great-grandfather, mother, grandmother, and great-grandmother. If one of these persons are still alive, their name is skipped and the corresponding earlier generation person is offered oblation. Then a final oblation is offered to those anonymous souls which died and have nobody in their lineage offering oblation. These oblations are believed to give birth to good children without mental or physical challenges.

The dark fortnight of Aswayuja (September–October) is known as the Pitru Paksha (Mahalaya), which is especially sacred for offering oblations to departed ancestors. The last day of this period, the dark moon day, called mahalaya Amavasya, is considered the most important day in the year for performing obsequies and rites. The manes return to their abode on the evening of Deepavali. Due to the grace of the Yama, it has been ordained that offerings made during this period benefit all the departed souls, whether they are connected to you or not.

Rameshwaram
In Tamil Nadu, lakhs of People will make special Tharpanam (Oblation) in Rameshwaram & other Holy Theerthas on Thai Amavasai, Aadi Amavasai, Mahalaya Amavasai. Thai Amavasai comes in the month of Jan-Feb and is the 1st Amavasai after Uttranayana Punya Kaalam (Northern Journey of Sun). Aadi Amavasai comes in the month of Jul-Aug and is the 1st Amavasai after Dakshinayanam Punya Kaalam (Southern Journey of Sun). Pitru Paksh Mahalaya Amavasai comes during Navratri

References

External links
 Kalnirnay on iPhone 
 Tithi Calendar
 A discussion of Amāvāsyā translation issues within Monier-Williams’ Sanskrit Dictionary
  Amavasya

Hindu astronomy
Hindu calendar
Hindu astrology
Days of the Hindu calendar
Observances held on the new moon
Hindu festivals